The Ashland Downtown Historic District in Ashland, Oregon is a  historic district (United States) which was listed on the National Register of Historic Places in 2000. The district is roughly bounded by Lithia Way and C Street, Church, Lithia Park and Hargadine and Gresham Streets. 

The listing included 55 contributing buildings and six contributing objects, as well as 26 non-contributing buildings and one non-contributing object.  Eleven buildings were already separately listed on the National Register. Buildings include:
Ashland Masonic Lodge Building, NRHP-listed in 1992
Ashland IOOF Building, or IOOF Building NRHP-listed in 1978
Citizen's Banking & Trust Co. Building, 232-242 E. Main St., NRHP-listed in 1985
Enders Building, 250–300 E. Main St., NRHP-listed in 1986
First Baptist Church (1911), 241 Hargadine Street, NRHP-listed in 1979 
First National Bank, NRHP-listed in 1980
Ashland Springs Hotel, also known as the Lithia Springs Hotel and as the Mark Antony Motor Lodge, NRHP-listed in 1978
Fordyce & Julia Roper House, NRHP-listed in 1985
Trinity Episcopal Church, NRHP-listed in 1984
Vaupel Store and Oregon Hotel Building, NRHP-listed in 1980
Whittle Garage Building, NRHP-listed in 1997, and
Ashland's City Hall.

Contributing objects include:
Carter Memorial Fountain

See also
 National Register of Historic Places listings in Jackson County, Oregon

References

External links
 

Ashland, Oregon
Historic districts on the National Register of Historic Places in Oregon		
National Register of Historic Places in Jackson County, Oregon